(K)now_Name (stylized as (K)NoW_NAME) is a Japanese music group affiliated with Toho Animation Records. Formed in 2016, the group primarily provides music for anime series.

History
The project was conceived by anime producer Masaya Saitou, who wanted a music group that could create music in various genres for any anime. Collaborating with Mikami Masataka, who was a music producer at Toho Animation Records at the time, musicians, Makoto Miyazaki, R.O.N, Shuhei Mutsuki, Kohei by Simonsayz, Genki Mizuno, and eNu, all of whom are affiliated with music production company Verygoo, joined the project. They later held an audition to find vocalists for the project. Three vocalists Ayaka Tachibana, Nikiie, and Aij were chosen, forming the group (K)NoW_NAME in January 2016. The group first work was the soundtrack for the 2016 anime television series Grimgar of Fantasy and Ash, including the opening and ending themes.

Saitou originally wanted to name the group NO_NAME but there was already another group with the same name. Still wanted something similar to match the concept that he had, he changed the spelling to (K)NoW_NAME, in which "Know" means "Knows only the name", "Now" referring to the project that they could be working on at any time, and added the notation "(K)" to the word "No" form the original name to became "(K)NoW_NAME", indicating that there are three hidden names. Instead of using the members' real portraits, Saitou wanted to use original illustrations of the members to convey the creativity of the group. Illustrations for the group are handled by South Korean artist So-bin.

Members
Vocalists
 Ayaka Tachibana
 Nikiie
 Aij

Composers
 R.O.N
 Makoto Miyazaki
 Shuhei Mutsuki
 Hiromitsu Kawashima
 Kohei by Simonsayz
 eNu
 Genki Mizuno

Illustrator
 So-bin

Works

References

External links
 Official website 
 

2016 establishments in Japan
Anime composers
Anime singers
Japanese musical groups
Musical groups established in 2016
Record production teams